Kikuube District  is a district in the Western Region of Uganda. It is named after its main municipal centre, Kikuube.

Location
Kikuube District is bordered by Hoima District to the north and east, Kakumiro District to the southeast, Kibaale District and Kagadi District to the south, Ntoroko District to the southwest and Lake Albert and the Democratic Republic of the Congo to the west.

Overview
Up until 30 June 2018, Kikuube District was part of Hoima District. On 1 July 2018, the southwestern portion of Hoima District was hived off to create Kikuube District. As of October 2020, Bunyoro sub-region comprises the districts of 1. Hoima 2. Buliisa 3. Masindi 4.  Kiryandongo 5. Kakumiro 6. Kibaale, 7. Kagadi and 8. the district of Kikuube. The establishment of Kikuube District led to the creation of an estimated 700 new jobs.

Population
The national population census and household survey held on 27 August 2014 enumerated 267,455 people in the district. In 2020, the Uganda Bureau of Statistics (UBOS), estimated the mid-year population of the district at approximately 358,700 people, with about 184,200 (51.4 percent) males and 174,500 (48.6 percent) females. The district population grew at an estimated 5.15 percent average annual rate, between 2014 and 2020. Approximately 89.5 percent of the district population is rural and 10.5 percent of the population is urban.

Economic activities
In 2006, the Kingfisher oil field was discovered in Kikuube District. Oil production, processing facilities will be located on the Buhuka Flats at the shores of Lake Albert with the start of the East African Crude Oil Pipeline. Kikuube district in common with Hoima District, from which it was created, has considerable undeveloped oil and natural gas deposits. 

With the establishment of Hoima Sugar Limited, many smallholder farmers have taken up growling sugarcane. As of September 2020, in excess of 3,500 smallholder farmers, had signed out-grower contracts with the sugar factory and collectively had over  under sugarcane cultivation.

See also
 Kabwoya
 Nzizi Thermal Power Station

References

External links
 Eight feared dead in Lake Albert water accident As of 25 May 2020.

Districts of Uganda
 
Western Region, Uganda
Bunyoro sub-region
Lake Albert (Africa)